The Black Theater Alliance Awards (BTAA) were initiated in 1995.

Best play
1995 - Doo Wop Shoo Bop - Black Ensemble Theater
1996 - Train Is Comin' - Chicago Theater Company
1997 - This Far By Faith - ETA Creative Arts Foundation
1998 - Chicago's Golden Soul - Black Ensemble Theater

Best production of a musical or revue
2003 - Howlin' At The Moon - Black Ensemble Theater
2004	- Eyes (play) - ETA Creative Arts Foundation
2005 -	At Last: A Tribute To Etta James - Black Ensemble Theater
2006	- Nina Simone: The High Priestess Speaks - Black Ensemble Theater
2007	- Memphis Soul: The Story of Stax Records - Black Ensemble Theater
2008	- Sounds So Good Makes You Wanna Holler - Old School vs. Nu Skool - Black Ensemble Theater
2009	- Sanctified (play) - Congo Square Theatre Company

External links

American theater awards
Awards established in 1995